The  is a river in the Kantō region of Japan. It is nicknamed Bandō Tarō; Bandō is an obsolete alias of the Kantō Region, and Tarō is a popular given name for an oldest son. It is regarded as one of the "Three Greatest Rivers" of Japan, the others being the Yoshino in Shikoku and the Chikugo in Kyūshū.

Geography 

The Tone gathers tributaries and pours into the Pacific Ocean at Cape Inubō, Choshi in Chiba Prefecture.

Tributaries 
The Edo River branches away from the river and flows into Tokyo Bay.

History 

The Tone River was once known for its uncontrollable nature, and its route changed whenever floods occurred. It is hard to trace its ancient route, but it originally flowed into Tokyo Bay along the route of the present-day Edo River, and tributaries like the Watarase and Kinu had independent river systems. For the sake of water transportation and flood control, extensive construction began in the 17th century during the Tokugawa shogunate, when the Kantō region became the political center of Japan. The course of the river was significantly changed, and the present route of the river was determined during the Meiji period, with the assistance of Dutch civil engineer Anthonie Rouwenhorst Mulder. Its vast watershed is thus largely artificial.

Two ships of the Imperial Japanese Navy were named after the river, one of World War I vintage and another from World War II, the lead ship of its class.

Fukushima Daiichi nuclear disaster

As a result of the Fukushima Daiichi nuclear disaster radioactive cesium concentrations of 110 becquerels per kilogram were found in silver crucian carp fish caught in the Tone River in April 2012. Six fishery cooperatives and 10 towns along the river were asked to stop all shipments of fish caught in the Tone.

Use 

The Tone River was an indispensable inland water link between the capitol at Edo, and later Tokyo, to the Pacific Ocean. It carried not only local products like soy sauce from Choshi, but also products from the Tōhoku region, in order to save time and to avoid risk in the open sea. With the advent of the railway in the 19th century major shipping on the Tone quickly declined, and inland ports such as Noda, Sekiyado, now part of Noda, Nagareyama, and Sawara, now part of Katori diminished in importance. Today the river has several dams that supply water for more than 30 million inhabitants of metropolitan Tokyo and large-scale industrial areas such as the Keiyō Industrial Zone.

Rafting and kayaking

The Minakami onsen area in Gunma Prefecture is near the source for the Tone River and during the Spring snow melt period, April - June, the river provides consistent grade 4 rapids (on the International Scale of River Difficulty) over a  stretch. The river provides some of the best white water rafting and kayaking in Japan. The snow melt swells the river to grade 4 in spring; in the summer it is a gentle grade 2.

Cycling

The Tone River is home to Japan's longest car free cycling path. At over 220km long the Tone River Cycling Road 利根川サイクリングロード starts in Shibukawa City, Gunma and runs all the way to Choshi City, Chiba. The total route is over 230km but the final 10km or so into Choshi is on a road. The remaining 220km is on detached cycling paths high up on the river bank with great views of mountains while in Gunma and large rice fields and agriculture as you approach the ocean.

Image gallery

References

External links

Rivers of Gunma Prefecture
Rivers of Ibaraki Prefecture
Rivers of Saitama Prefecture
Rivers of Chiba Prefecture
Rivers of Japan